The Spanish–American War Memorial, also known as the 7th Regiment Monument, is installed in Los Angeles' Pershing Square, in the U.S. state of California.

See also 

 List of Los Angeles Historic-Cultural Monuments in Downtown Los Angeles

References

External links 
 

Downtown Los Angeles
Monuments and memorials in Los Angeles
Outdoor sculptures in Greater Los Angeles
Sculptures of men in California
Spanish–American War memorials in the United States
Statues in Los Angeles